Savoonga is a city in Nome Census Area, Alaska. It is located on St. Lawrence Island in the Bering Sea. As of the 2020 census, Savoonga's population was 835, up from 671 in 2010.

Savoonga was incorporated in 1969. In 1971, it became joint owner of St. Lawrence Island along with the island's only other city, Gambell.

The local economy consists largely of subsistence hunting for walrus, seals, fish, and bowhead whales. The city calls itself the "Walrus Capital of the World". A dogsled mail service operated until 1963.

History
St. Lawrence Island has been inhabited sporadically for the past 2,000 years by both Alaskan Yup'ik and Siberian Yupik people. In the 18th and 19th centuries, the island had a population of about 4,000 in numerous villages.

Between 1878 and 1880, a famine devastated the island's population. Many who did not starve left. The remaining population of St. Lawrence Island was nearly all Siberian Yupik.

In 1900, reindeer were introduced on the island and by 1917, the herd had grown to over 10,000 animals. A reindeer camp was established near present-day Savoonga in 1916. The village of Savoonga was established near the camp in the 1930s. Good hunting and trapping in the area attracted more residents.

Gambell and Savoonga received joint title to most of the land on St. Lawrence Island under the Alaska Native Claims Settlement Act of 1971.

Geography
Savoonga is on the northern coast of St. Lawrence Island in the Bering Sea.

Most people on St. Lawrence Island speak Siberian Yupik.

There are daily flights from Nome to Savoonga Airport, weather permitting.

Climate
Savoonga has a polar climate (Köppen ET) with short, cool summers and long, freezing winters lasting from the beginning of October to the end of May. Average annual snowfall totals  with peak snowpack depth being  in April.

Demographics

Savoonga first appeared on the 1930 U.S. Census as an unincorporated village. It formally incorporated in 1969.

At the 2000 census, there were 643 people, 145 households, and 113 families residing in the city. The racial makeup of the city was 95.33% Native American, 4.35% White, 0.16% Asian, and 0.16% from other races.

Of the 145 households, 55.2% had children under the age of 18 living with them, 49.7% were married couples living together, 15.9% had a female householder with no husband present, and 21.4% were non-families. 16.6% of all households were made up of individuals, and 0.7% had someone living alone who was 65 years of age or older. The average household size was 4.43 and the average family size was 5.22.

In the city, the age distribution of the population shows 36.1% under the age of 18, 13.2% from 18 to 24, 28.6% from 25 to 44, 16.5% from 45 to 64, and 5.6% who were 65 years of age or older. The median age was 26 years. For every 100 females, there were 101.6 males. For every 100 females age 18 and over, there were 115.2 males.

The median income for a household in the city was $23,438, and the median income for a family was $27,917. Males had a median income of $30,500 versus $29,167 for females. The per capita income for the city was $7,725. About 29.3% of families and 29.1% of the population were below the poverty line, including 40.6% of those under age 18 and 9.8% of those age 65 or over.

Economy
, 25% of the adults in the community had no jobs. Of those who did, 37% worked for the school system. Other jobs involved air transportation, fishing, and the oil industry.

Education
Savoonga is served by the Bering Strait School District. Hogarth Kingeekuk Memorial School serves grades Pre-K through 12.

Notable people
Annie Aghnaqa (Akeya) Alowa (1924–1999), Yup'ik environmental activist, healer, leader

References

External links
Article by Gene Weingarten discussing alcoholism and suicide among Savoongans
Video

Cities in Alaska
Cities in Nome Census Area, Alaska
Populated coastal places in Alaska on the Pacific Ocean
Siberian Yupik
St. Lawrence Island